GFDL, or GNU Free Documentation License, is a  license for free documentation.

GFDL may also refer to:
Geophysical Fluid Dynamics Laboratory, a division of NOAA
 GFDL hurricane model (see: Tropical cyclone forecast model)